The Mōkihinui River is a river located on the West Coast of New Zealand's South Island, about 40 kilometres north of Westport. Meridian Energy had proposed the Mokihinui Hydro project on the river in 2007 but it was cancelled in May 2012. In 2019, it was announced that large parts of the river catchment, including  of river bed, would be added to Kahurangi National Park.

The New Zealand Ministry for Culture and Heritage gives a translation of "large flax-stalk raft" for Mōkihinui. Since 2019 the official name of the river has been spelled with a macron.

Geography 

The Mōkihinui River's headwaters are located in the Glasgow Range and its mouth is on the Tasman Sea.  There is little human habitation near the river: the localities of Mokihinui and Summerlea are near the river's mouth, Seddonville is a few kilometres up the river, and just prior to its terminus, State Highway 67 crosses the river outside Mokihinui. In the rugged back country behind Seddonville at the Mōkihinui Forks, the river splits into two branches, north and south. The catchment of these two branches is a large inland basin of almost wholly unmodified forest.

Lake Perrine and Lake Dora are in the Mōkihinui Forks area. They are landslide lakes, dammed when slopes collapsed during the 1929 Murchison Earthquake. The earthquake created the dams on 17 June, but  of the Lake Perrine dam washed out on 4 July 1929. It carried debris which formed a new temporary dam in the gorge below Seddonville. That water backed up until some buildings in Seddonville were flooded to their rooftops. The wooden hall floated about  before bumping against a shop. It was replaced by the H. E. Holland Memorial Library.

Culture 

Ngāi Tahu and Ngāti Waewae are the manawhenua tribes of the area.

Recreation
A tramping track called the Old Ghost Road runs along the south bank of the river giving access to Kahurangi National Park.

The river of interest for recreation and commercial whitewater activities. There is three hours of grade III water downstream from where the north and south forks meet. A river level of 1.0–1.5 metres is an optimum flow.

Railway 
The last few kilometres of the former Seddonville Branch railway roughly followed the Mōkihinui River near its mouth. The Branch opened on 23 February 1895 and closed on 3 May 1981, while a further extension beyond Seddonville to Mokihinui Mine closed in February 1974.

During this period, the New Zealand Railways Department dumped two old steam locomotives along the river's banks between Seddonville and Mokihinui Mine to protect against erosion. The first of these locomotives, WB 292, was dumped in 1958, while sister WB 299 was dumped in January 1960. Both were recovered from the Mōkihinui River in 1989 by the Baldwin Steam Trust, and are under restoration at the Rimutaka Incline Railway.

References 

Buller District
Rivers of the West Coast, New Zealand
Rivers of New Zealand